Gojko Vučinić (29.09.1970 - 14.04.2021) was a former  Montenegrin handballer who stood 1.94 m tall and weighted 94 kg. He played for Arrate and Sanlo Elgoibar, as well as being a coach member of both teams for several years. He also played on the Montenegro men's national handball team. He died on 14 April 2021 in Eibar.

References 

1970 births
Living people
Montenegrin male handball players
Liga ASOBAL players